The Stuart Fork Trinity River (also called Stewart's Fork) is a  tributary of the Trinity River in the U.S. state of California. The Trinity river rises in the Trinity Alps and flows generally southeast into Trinity Lake, a reservoir formed by the Trinity Dam, just north of Buckeye Ridge. Important tributaries include Deer and Hobel Creeks; the last  of the river is submerged in the lake.

In the 1850s the Stuart Fork of the Trinity River was an important gold mine area, and was dredged by several mining companies. When the Trinity Lake levels are low you can still see large piles of tailings.

References

Rivers of Trinity County, California
Tributaries of the Klamath River
Rivers of Northern California